Jessica Dunn may refer to:

 Jessica "Jess" Dunn, a character in the Disney Channel TV series Secrets of Sulphur Springs
 Jessica Dunn, resident of Indianapolis Island in 2010 with Michael Runge
 Jessica Dunn, co-producer of the 2019 Christian drama film Breakthrough
 Jessica Dunn, choreographer of the play Curie, Curie